The Patriotic Revolutionary Youth Movement (YDG-H) was the urban, militant youth wing of the Kurdistan Workers' Party (PKK) from 2006-2015. Trained by more experienced PKK cadres for urban fighting, and consisting mostly of children and adults in the 15-25 age group, it was reportedly established in 2006. The group started to clash with Turkish security forces and tried to enforce their authority in the areas they were located in 2014 as part of a strategy which involved unilateral declaration of self-management in various towns in southeastern Turkey, and creation of trenches and barricades reinforced with IEDs and explosives to deny security forces access. 

The group was in favor of regional self-management for the Kurdish people in Southeast Anatolia. Other claimed objectives of the YDG-H include stopping all activities related to drugs and prostitution, and other similar crimes in the region.

In December 2015, the YDG-H was reorganized into the Civil Protection Units (YPS) militia.

See also
 People's Protection Units (YPG)

References

Kurdish organisations
Kurdistan Workers' Party
Left-wing militant groups in Turkey
Rebel groups in Turkey